Gioacchino Toesca e Ricci (1745–1799; known as Joaquín Toesca in the Spanish Empire) was an Italian architect who worked at the service of the Spanish Empire, mainly in Chile. He was mainly a Neoclassical architect although he also built Baroque buildings.

Biography
Gioacchino Toesca was born in 1745 in Rome. He studied architecture as a student of Francesco Sabatini and at the age of 15, he moved to Madrid and later completed his studies in mathematics in Barcelona.

Chilean architecture

In 1780 he traveled to South America, to Santiago in the colonial Captaincy General of Chile at the request of the Royal Governor Agustín de Jáuregui and the Archbishop Santiago Manuel de Alday y Aspée, who engaged him to design the Catedral de Santiago de Chile (present day Santiago Metropolitan Cathedral).   In addition to this project he was also occupied in developing the plans for the Palacio de la Moneda to house the royal mint, which later became Chile's presidential palace.

Toesca died in 1799 and did not live to see his two major projects, the Cathedral and the Palacio, completed. He also worked on the construction of the Santo Domingo Church, Santiago. His designs were generally in the neoclassical style of the period. His creative influence on Santiago—directly and through his many students—is notable.

References

External links
Memoria.chilena: El arquitecto Joaquín Toesca (1752–1799) – biography  (in Spanish)
Patrimonio.cultural: Story of Toesca's (scandalous) Wife – (in Spanish)

Architects from Rome
Neoclassical architects
People of the Spanish colonial Americas
1745 births
1799 deaths
18th-century Chilean people
Italian neoclassical architects
Italian emigrants to Chile